The Smithsonian Folklife Festival, launched in 1967, is an international exhibition of living cultural heritage presented annually in the summer in Washington, D.C. in the United States. It is held on the National Mall for two weeks around the Fourth of July (the U.S. Independence Day) holiday. The Smithsonian Center for Folklife and Cultural Heritage produces the Festival.

The Festival is free to the public, encouraging cultural exchange. Attracting more than one million visitors yearly, the two-week-long celebration is the largest annual cultural event in the United States capital. Usually divided into programs featuring a nation, region, state or theme, the Festival has featured tradition bearers from more than 90 nations, every region of the United States, scores of ethnic communities, more than 100 American Indian groups, and some 70 different occupations.

The Festival generally includes daily and evening programs of music, song, dance, celebratory performance, crafts and cooking demonstrations, storytelling, illustrations of workers' culture, and narrative sessions for discussing cultural issues.  Cultural practitioners speak for themselves, with each other, and to the public. Visitors participate, learning, singing, dancing, eating traditional foods, and conversing with people that the Festival program presents.

List of programs by year
The regions and topics featured at the Smithsonian Folklife Festival since its inception in 1967:

1976 Bicentennial festival
As part of the nationwide Bicentennial celebration, the 1976 American Folklife Festival was extended into a 12-week event held from June 16 to September 6. Years of preparation in collaboration with thousands of scholars, performers, and preservationists produced programs, activities, and outdoor exhibitions running five days a week, Wednesday through Sunday. The festival took place in the western part of the National Mall, south of the Reflection Pool.

Scenes from the 2008 festival

References

External links

Smithsonian Folklife Festival
Smithsonian Online Virtual Archives
Indiana University Folklore Institute Files on the Smithsonian Festival of American Folklife 1987, 1979-1995, bulk 1986-1987

Recurring events established in 1967
Folklife Festival
Festivals in Washington, D.C.
Cultural festivals in the United States
July events
Multiculturalism in the United States
1967 establishments in Washington, D.C.
Festivals of multiculturalism